Conspiracy of One is the sixth studio album by American rock band the Offspring, released on November 14, 2000, by Columbia Records. By the time of its release, the band had come out in support of peer-to-peer file sharing, claiming it would not hurt sales. Conspiracy of One was originally planned to be released directly on their website before retail, until Columbia Records threatened to sue and the album ended up as a physical release. The album was the last to feature drummer Ron Welty, who was fired from the band in March 2003 and went on to form his own band Steady Ground.

Conspiracy of One debuted at number nine on the US Billboard 200, selling over 125,000 copies in its first week of sales, and spawned the singles "Original Prankster", "Want You Bad", and "Million Miles Away". Although not as successful as their previous album Americana (1998), it was later certified platinum by the RIAA in the United States.

Background and recording
The Offspring spent much of 1999 on tour promoting the Americana album. They also appeared at the infamous Woodstock 1999, where their performance was broadcast live on pay-per-view television. After some time off, the members reconvened in early 2000 to begin work on new material, nine songs of which were in the demo phase at the time. Frontman Dexter Holland told Rolling Stone in May 2000 that, "we came home last Christmas and we kind of took a month just trying to recoup and we started thinking, 'Well, do we want to get started on another record right away?'. "We're all pretty excited about the way things have gone so I spent a couple of months trying to come up with some new material and then [started] jamming out these demos." The Offspring officially entered the studio to begin recording sessions for Conspiracy of One in June 2000. For the recording of the album, the band tapped Brendan O'Brien as its producer and recorded the album at NRG studios in North Hollywood, California over a two-month period.

Reception
Conspiracy of One was released on November 14, 2000, and peaked at number 9 on the US Billboard 200 album chart. Five weeks after its release, the album was certified gold and platinum. The album was also successful in Canada, selling 25,231 copies in its first week and debuting at #4 on the Canadian Albums Chart. The album was certified 2× Platinum by the CRIA in February 2007.

Liana Jonas of AllMusic described Conspiracy of One as The Offspring's "most musically mature collection to date". Jonas praised the music as "tight arrangements, vocal interplay and refined guitar work" and claims the band injected "elements of hip hop, rap metal, and Nirvana-like grunge into a few songs". The album received a rating of three and a half out of five stars, while producing three singles, "Original Prankster", "Want You Bad" and "Million Miles Away", that earned The Offspring its commercial success.  So far, the album holds a score of 60 out of 100 from Metacritic based on "mixed or average reviews". The album was included at number 13 on Rock Sounds "The 51 Most Essential Pop Punk Albums of All Time" list.

Track listing

Bonus tracks

Chart performance

Weekly charts

Year-end charts

Certifications

Personnel

The Offspring
 Dexter Holland – lead vocals, rhythm guitar
 Noodles – lead guitar, backing vocals
 Greg K. – bass, backing vocals
 Ron Welty – drums

Additional personnel
Redman – vocals on "Original Prankster"
Chris "X-13" Higgins – backing vocals

Production
Brendan O'Brien - producer, mixing
Justin Beope – design
Billy Bowers – engineer
Nick DiDia – engineer
David Dominguez – assistant engineer
Karl Egsieker – mixing
Ryan Williams – mixing
Sean Evans – art direction
Alan Forbes – illustrations
Ross Garfield – drum technician
Sarkis Kaloustian – design
Steve Masi – guitar technician
Eddy Schreyer – mastering

References

Notes

Sources

Bibliography

External links

 Conspiracy of One at YouTube (streamed copy where licensed)
 Official page for the album
 

The Offspring albums
2000 albums
Columbia Records albums
Albums produced by Brendan O'Brien (record producer)